Christopher Hellmann (born 16 October 1992) is a German former professional footballer who played as a winger.

Career
Hellmann played for two seasons with German side FC Astoria Walldorf between 2011 and 2013, before accepting a scholarship to play college soccer at Lynn University, where he played until 2015. Hellmann also spent the 2014 and 2015 off-season playing with Premier Development League side Des Moines Menace.

On 14 January 2016, Vancouver Whitecaps FC selected Hellmann 29th overall in the 2016 MLS SuperDraft. However, Hellmann was not signed by Vancouver, later signing with United Soccer League side Charlotte Independence on 2 March 2016.

He left Charlotte in June 2016, and signed with German Regionalliga Südwest side FC Astoria Walldorf.

References

External links
 
 
 

1992 births
Living people
German footballers
Association football forwards
Charlotte Independence players
Des Moines Menace players
FC Astoria Walldorf players
Footballers from Cologne
Lynn Fighting Knights men's soccer players
Regionalliga players
Tormenta FC players
USL Championship players
USL League One players
USL League Two players
Vancouver Whitecaps FC draft picks
German expatriate footballers
German expatriate sportspeople in the United States
Expatriate soccer players in the United States